Claire Elizabeth Cottrill (born August 18, 1998), known professionally as Clairo, is an American singer-songwriter. Born in Atlanta, Georgia, and raised in Carlisle, Massachusetts, she began posting music on the internet at age 13.

Clairo rose to prominence following the viral success of the music video for her lo-fi single "Pretty Girl" in 2017. She subsequently signed a record deal, releasing her debut EP Diary 001 (2018) with Fader Label. Her debut studio album Immunity (2019) received critical acclaim and spawned the singles "Bags" and "Sofia", the latter of which became her first single to chart on the Billboard Hot 100. Cottrill's second studio album, Sling, was released in 2021. Upon its release, the album received critical acclaim and saw commercial success, debuting in the top 20 of the US Billboard 200.

Life and career
Claire Cottrill was born in Atlanta, Georgia, and raised in Carlisle, Massachusetts. She is the daughter of marketing executive Geoff Cottrill and Allie Cottrill, a photographer and designer.

2011–2017: career beginnings 
Cottrill began recording covers at the age of 13; she often performed covers at local businesses including Blue Dry Goods. During this time, MTV contacted her to record a song to be used as background music for one of their shows, but the song was never used. She began posting music to Bandcamp under the names Clairo and DJ Baby Benz while attending Concord-Carlisle High School. She went on to post covers and songs in addition to DJ mixes of rap music on SoundCloud. She also maintained a YouTube channel where she would post covers and short films.

She launched her EP Do U Wanna Fall in Love? in 2013 after releasing several home recordings. A few additional EPs, including Aquarius Boy, Late Show, Moth Girl, Metal Heart, and Have a Nice Day, came after this in 2015. 

Clairo first drew wide attention in late 2017 when the video for her song "Pretty Girl" went viral on YouTube. The song was recorded for an indie rock compilation benefiting the Transgender Law Center. According to her, she recorded the track "using the resources around me which were pretty shitty. I used like a little keyboard that I had and I was really into '80s pop music — my mom is obsessed with it — so it kind of inspired me to do something like that." She has attributed audience interest in the video to YouTube's algorithm system. The video also became popular on vaporwave-centric Facebook groups. "Pretty Girl" had amassed more than 81 million views on YouTube by 2022. A piece written by Joe Coscarelli of The New York Times said that the work: "bridges both worlds, building on the coy, understated bedroom pop of 'Pretty Girl' and 'Flaming Hot Cheetos' toward sturdier numbers like '4EVER' and 'B.O.M.D.'".

Another video, "Flaming Hot Cheetos", was released a month before "Pretty Girl" on YouTube. It garnered 3 million views by July 2018. The success of "Pretty Girl" led to interest from major labels such as Capitol, RCA, and Columbia. Jon Cohen, the co-founder of The Fader, signed Clairo to the magazine's associated record label with a 12-song record contract and introduced her to Pat Corcoran, manager of Chance the Rapper. She became a client of talent agency Haight Brand near the end of 2017. After the success of "Pretty Girl", a number of social media users (specifically on discussion website Reddit) began claiming that Clairo was an "industry plant" who gained success through her father's nepotism. She denied the claims, calling them sexist. Writers for The Guardian and The Ringer also stated that her father's connections facilitated her record contract signing. In 2021 she spoke openly about the accusations, telling Rolling Stone, "I definitely am not blind to the fact that things have been easier for me than other people's experiences. It would be stupid of me to not acknowledge the privilege I had from the start to be able to sign somewhere where there's trust, to be able to sign a record deal that doesn't revolve around keeping myself afloat financially."

2018–present: Immunity and Sling 
On May 25, 2018, Fader Label released Clairo's debut record, titled Diary 001. In her review for Pitchfork, Fader contributor Sasha Geffen wrote that the EP ought to subside the "legions of naysayers who dismissed her as a one-hit fluke or an industry plant." That same month, she announced a headlining tour throughout North America, as well as select dates opening for Dua Lipa. Her July performance at the Bowery Ballroom in New York was a sold-out show. In October 2018, she performed at Lollapalooza. She performed at Coachella in 2019.

On May 24, 2019, Clairo released a new single, "Bags", and announced her debut studio album Immunity which was released on August 2, 2019. She would further release two more singles from the album "Closer to You" and "Sofia". Following the album's commercial success, Apple Music named Clairo an Up Next artist in August 2019. Clairo made her television debut performing "I Wouldn't Ask You" on Jimmy Kimmel Live! in September 2019, before performing "Bags" on The Ellen DeGeneres Show a few days later. In December 2019, Clairo won Pop Artist of the Year at the 2019 Boston Music Awards for the second consecutive year, as well as Album of the Year for Immunity. "Bags" was included in over 15 critics' lists ranking the year's top songs including Pitchfork's and Paste's lists of best songs of the decade. Immunity was included in over 10 critics' end of year lists, including The Guardian, Pitchfork, Billboard and Los Angeles Times. As of 2019, Clairo was managed by Mike Ahern and Jimmy Bui. 

In April 2020, Clairo revealed that she had begun working on her second studio album via a tweet of a screenshot of a playlist titled 'Album 2 (demos so far)'. On October of that same year, Clairo formed a new band called Shelly with indie-pop artist Claud and their two friends from Syracuse University, Josh Mehling and Noa Frances Getzug. The group released two songs, "Steeeam" and "Natural", on October 30, 2020. On June 11, 2021, Clairo released "Blouse", the first single from her second studio album, Sling, which was announced that same day. Sling is an album for Cottrill, but it is also a record of her attempts to reevaluate her goals in life. Sling, which replaces Immunity's sparse electronic flourishes with lush, acoustic folk frequently adorned with swooning vocal harmonies, delicate strings, and the warm swell of brass, bears the Laurel Canyon imprint. The album was released on July 16, 2021. In February 2022, Clairo embarked on the US leg of the Sling tour. She cancelled the last three dates of her North American tour, after a technical incident at her gig in Toronto left her with temporary hearing damage. Her opening show of the UK tour in Bristol, had to be cancelled after two songs due to a case of sinusitis that was affecting her voice, leading to her having a panic attack onstage, and walking off it. The Glasgow show was cancelled but the show the day after it in Manchester went ahead, and her final UK show of that tour was in London. In 2023, she will appear as an opening act for Boygenius during the inaugural Re:SET Concert Series.

Artistry 
Clairo recalled that the Shins' Wincing the Night Away (2007) was the first album she "really completely geeked out over", crediting it as her inspiration to make music. Based on the fact that many around her told her that a career in music was unlikely, she did not consider it a likely prospect and musically "kind of did whatever" she wanted. She has stated that her musical influences were a mixture of her mother and father's musical taste, citing musicians such as Al Green, Brenton Wood, Billy Paul, Cocteau Twins, Trashcan Sinatras, The The and Public Image Ltd.

Activism 
In May 2022, a leaked draft opinion showed that the U.S. Supreme Court was planning to overturn abortion rights established in Roe v. Wade. Cottrill, alongside other musical artists like Lorde, Olivia Rodrigo and Phoebe Bridgers, signed a full-page ad in The New York Times condemning the planned Supreme Court decision. While performing at Glastonbury in June 2022, Cottrill wore a t-shirt saying "Bans Off Our Bodies" in protest to the U.S. Supreme Court's Dobbs v. Jackson Women's Health Organization final decision which overturned access to abortion granted in Roe v. Wade.

Personal life 
In the early days of her career, Cottrill was once in a relationship with Jake Passmore, who is a member of the London-based band SCORS.  

In 2017, Cottrill began attending Syracuse University.

Cottrill was diagnosed with juvenile idiopathic arthritis at the age of 17. Cottrill came out as bisexual to her fans via Twitter in May 2018. In an interview, she explained that making friends in college is what helped her to come out as they were openly gay and she was inspired by "their confidence and their willingness to be exposed." In July 2020, she signed an open letter to then-UK Equalities minister Liz Truss calling for a ban on all forms of LGBT+ conversion therapy.

Discography

Studio albums
 Immunity (2019)
 Sling (2021)

EPs
 Diary 001

Awards and nominations

References

External links

 
 
 

1998 births
Living people
21st-century American women singers
American women pop singers
American indie pop musicians
American indie rock musicians
American Internet celebrities
LGBT people from Massachusetts
Musicians from Massachusetts
People from Carlisle, Massachusetts
Syracuse University alumni
Bedroom pop musicians
Bisexual musicians
Bisexual women
American LGBT singers
NME Awards winners
21st-century American singers
21st-century American LGBT people